Sporidia are result of homokaryotic smut fungi (which are not pathogenic), asexual reproduction through the process of budding. 

Thus far, this has only been observed in vitro.

References
C.J. Alexopolous, Charles W. Mims, M. Blackwell  et al., Introductory Mycology, 4th ed. (John Wiley and Sons, Hoboken NJ, 2004)  

Fungal morphology and anatomy